Until 1993, the first syndic was the speaker of the General Council of Andorra. Below is a list of office holders from 1841 until 1993:

See also 
 List of general syndics of the General Council

Footnotes 

Andorra politics-related lists

Lists of office-holders